The Engineer's Ring is a ring worn by members of the United States Order of the Engineer, a fellowship of engineers who must be a certified Professional Engineer or graduated from an accredited engineering program (or be within one academic year of graduation to participate). The ring is usually a stainless steel band worn on the little finger of the dominant hand. This is so that it makes contact with all work done by the engineer. Rings used to be cast in iron in the most unattractive and simple form to show the nature of work. The ring is symbolic of the oath taken by the wearer, and symbolizes the unity of the profession in its goal of benefitting mankind. The stainless steel from which the ring is made depicts the strength of the profession.

Starting in 1970, it was inspired by the original Canadian Ritual of the Calling of an Engineer ceremony which began a century ago in 1922. Canadian engineers about to graduate are invited to attend the ring ceremony by the Corporation of the Seven Wardens in order to take the oath known as the Obligation of The Engineer,. Only those who have met the standards of professional engineering training or experience are able to accept the Obligation, which is voluntarily received for life.

The Obligation of The Engineer
The required oath, taken immediately before accepting the Engineer's Ring, is known as "The Obligation of the Engineer" and is as follows:

See also
 Engineering ethics
 Hippocratic Oath
 IEEE
 List of engineering awards
 National Society of Professional Engineers
 Ritual of the Calling of an Engineer

References

External links

 Official Website
 ASCE Order of the Engineer Website

Engineering awards
Rings (jewellery)